José María Vallsera (born 24 June 1919) is a Colombian retired sports shooter. He competed in the 50 metre rifle, three positions event at the 1960 Summer Olympics.

References

External links
 

1919 births
Possibly living people
Colombian male sport shooters
Olympic shooters of Colombia
Shooters at the 1960 Summer Olympics
Sportspeople from Bogotá